Matt Thomas (born 7 January 1976) is an English former professional rugby league footballer who played in the 2000s and 2010s. Matt attended the University of Luton and is a qualified sports therapist and personal trainer.

References

External links
(archived by web.archive.org) London Skolars profile

1976 births
Living people
London Skolars players
Swinton Lions players
Rugby league players from London
Wales national rugby league team players
Rugby league centres
Rugby league second-rows